Terence James Mullen (born 28 February 1956) was a Scottish footballer who played for Dumbarton, Falkirk, Stenhousemuir and East Stirlingshire.

References

1956 births
Scottish footballers
Dumbarton F.C. players
Falkirk F.C. players
East Stirlingshire F.C. players
Stenhousemuir F.C. players
Scottish Football League players
Living people
Association football defenders